Like many urban areas, Melbourne, the capital city of Victoria, Australia, faces environmental issues, many related to the city's large urban footprint and urban sprawl and the demand for infrastructure and services.

Impact of drought
One such issue is the impact of drought on water supply. Periodic droughts and consistently high summer temperatures deplete Melbourne's water supplies, and climate change may exacerbate the long-term impact of these factors. During the Millennium drought, the Bracks Government implemented water restrictions and a range of other options including water recycling, incentives for household water tanks, greywater systems, water consumption awareness initiatives, and other water-saving and reuse initiatives. But as water storages continued to fall further measures were required; in June 2007 the Bracks Government announced the construction of the $3.1 billion Wonthaggi desalination plant, and the so-called North-South Pipeline from the Goulburn Valley in Victoria's north to Melbourne. Neither project was used extensively before the drought broke during 2010, and therefore both have been criticised as 'white elephants'.

Response to climate change
In response to attribution of recent climate change, in 2002 the City of Melbourne set a target to reduce carbon emissions to net zero by 2020 and Moreland City Council established the Zero Moreland program. Not all metropolitan municipalities have followed suit, with the City of Glen Eira notably deciding in 2009 not to become carbon-neutral. Melbourne has one of the largest urban footprints in the world due to its low-density housing, resulting in a vast suburban sprawl, with a high level of car dependence and minimal public transport outside of inner areas. Much of the vegetation within the city is non-native species, most of European origin, including many invasive species and noxious weeds. Significant introduced urban pests include the common myna, feral pigeon, brown rat, European wasp, common starling and red fox. Many outlying suburbs, particularly towards the Yarra Valley and the hills to the northeast and east, have gone for extended periods without regenerative fires leading to a lack of saplings and undergrowth in urbanised native bushland. The Department of Sustainability and Environment partially addresses this problem by regularly burning off. Responsibility for regulating pollution falls under the jurisdiction of the EPA Victoria and several local councils. Air quality, by world standards, is classified as good.  Summer and autumn are the worst times of year for atmospheric haze in the urban area.

Dredging in Melbourne
An environmental issue that was raised in Melbourne in 2008 was the Victorian government project of channel deepening Melbourne Ports by dredging Port Phillip Bay—the Port Phillip Channel Deepening Project. It was subject to controversy and strict regulations among fears that beaches and marine wildlife could be affected by the disturbance of heavy metals and other industrial sediments. Other major pollution problems in Melbourne include levels of bacteria including E. coli in the Yarra River and its tributaries caused by septic systems, as well as litter. Up to 350,000 cigarette butts enter the storm water runoff every day. Several programs are being implemented to minimise beach and river pollution. In February 2010, The Transition Decade, an initiative to transition human society, economics and environment toward sustainability, was launched in Melbourne.

References

Environmental issues in Australia